The Lex Agraria can refer to a Roman law proposed in 133 BC during the tribunate of Tiberius Gracchus. The law involved the redistribution of public land, previously owned by the senatorial class, to the lower classes in ancient Rome, using money bequeathed to Rome in the will of Attalus III of Pergamum to purchase the land and provide resources with which the plebeians could start lives farming the land rather than suffering from debt and unemployment in the city. The law was most unpopular with the upper classes, and as a result of this, plus various other factors, Gracchus was murdered by a group of Senators later in the year. However, the law was passed that same year as a result of heavy pressure on the Senate from the Roman populace.

The Lex Agraria can also refer to a law passed in 111 BC between March 15 and the harvest season. This statute recognized the land claims made in Italy, Africa, and Greece since the earlier Lex Agraria of 133 BC.

See also
 Compascuus
 Roman law
 List of Roman laws

References 

Roman law